Abdullah M. Alamri is a Saudi Arabian professor of geophysics, at the King Saud University since 1990. He is the Founder & EiC of the Arabian J. of Geosciences. He also serves as the Director of Seismic Studies Center, Editor-in-Chief of AJGS, and is currently serving as the President of Saudi Society of Geosciences.

Career 
Abdullah obtained his B.Sc. in geology (1981) from King Saud University, and M. Sc.in Applied Geophysics from University of South Florida, Tampa and has also taken Ph.D. (1990) in earthquake seismology from University of Minnesota, United States. His interest in crustal structures, seismic micro zoning and applications of EM and MT in deep groundwater exploration and geothermal prospecting has paved way for the establishment of the Arabian Journal of Geosciences (AJGS). AJGS publishes one issue of 30–35 articles every two weeks (24 issues a year in total) and covers the entire range of topics in Earth Sciences.

He is a principal and co-investigator of several national and international projects: KSU, KACST, SGS, ARAMCO, DSFP, NPST, IRIS, CTBTO, US Air force, NSF, UCSD, LLNL, OSU, PSU and Max Planck. He has also chaired and co-chaired several SSG, GSF, RELEMR workshops and forums in the Middle East.

References

External links 

Living people
Academic staff of King Saud University
Year of birth missing (living people)
Earth sciences